L.J. Institute of Engineering & Technology, commonly referred as LJIET, is a private technical institute located in sarkhej, Ahmedabad, Gujarat, India. Institute is approved by All India Council for Technical Education and is the part of L.J. Group of Institutes managed by Lok Jagruti Kendra (LJK) Trust. Mayur

Academic Programmes

Facilities

Laboratories
Each department has laboratories for U.G. and P.G. programs.

Workshop
The workshop is equipped to show students the basic operations of manufacturing and production.

Library
The library has wide range of technical books, periodicals, reference books, handbooks, encyclopedias and Indian standards. The library has book bank facility for students.

Computing facility
Each department has its own computer center, connected with internet and printer facility.

Training and placement cell
The institute maintains a training and placement cell to help students prepare for job searches. Assistance is given to students in developing interviewing skills.

Canteen
The canteen is located at the center of the campus. This facility is available for the students and staff at competitive rates.

Festivals

Notion
Notion is an annual technical festival organized by students and alumni of the college. Festival covers all technical and non-technical activities from all the departments. Notion started from 2017 and is progressing with good speed. It is generally organized in March every year.

Lumina
Lumina is annual inter-college cultural festival organized by students and alumni of the college. Activities like dance, music, drama and fashion show are celebrated with full joy.

Agone
Agone is annual sports festival organized by LJIET at LJ Campus. It is organized in April every year.

References

External links
 L.J. Group of Institute's Official website
 L.J. Knowledge Foundation
 Gujarat Technological University
 All India Council For Technical Education

Engineering colleges in Gujarat
Universities and colleges in Ahmedabad
All India Council for Technical Education
Educational institutions established in 2007
2007 establishments in Gujarat